The following is a list of squads for each nation competing at the 2008 European Women's Handball Championship in the Republic of Macedonia. The tournament started on 2 December and the final took place in Skopje on 14 December.

Each nation had to submit an initial squad of 28 players, 12 of them became reserves when the final squad of 16 players was announced on 1 December.

Appearances, goals and ages as of 1 December 2008.

Group A

Head coach: Jan Pytlick

Head coach: Olivier Krumbholz

Head coach:Vilmos Imre

Head coach: Radu Voina

Group B

Head coach: Marit Breivik

Head coach: Jorge Dueñas

Head coach: Paula Castro

Head coach: Leonid Yevtushenko

Group C

Head coach: Herbert Müller

Head coach: Konstantin Charovarov

Head coach: Evgeny Trefilov

Head coach: Ulf Schefvert

Group D

Head coach: Zdravko Zovko

Head coach: Armin Emrich

Head coach: Vladimir Gligorov

Head coach: Časlav Dinčić

Notes and references

External links
 
 Cumulatives statistics

2008 European Women's Handball Championship
European Handball Championship squads